1964 was the 65th season of County Championship cricket in England. Australia retained The Ashes as Bob Simpson led them through a hard-fought series, with only one match coming to a definite result. In domestic cricket, Worcestershire won the County Championship for the first time and Sussex retained the Gillette Cup List A competition.

Honours
County Championship – Worcestershire
Gillette Cup – Sussex
Minor Counties Championship – Lancashire II
Second XI Championship – Lancashire II 
Wisden (for their deeds in 1964) - Geoffrey Boycott, Peter Burge, Jack Flavell, Graham McKenzie, Bob Simpson

Test series

Australia retained the Ashes by beating England 1–0.  Australia won the Third Test at Headingley and the other four were all drawn. In the match that Australia won, they were 187–7 in reply to England's 268 when Ted Dexter decided to take the new ball. In response, Peter Burge, the last recognised batsman, went on the attack. He scored 160, well supported by Neil Hawke and Wally Grout, and the last three wickets added 211. 121 behind on first innings, England could not recover. Since a draw in the Fourth Test at Old Trafford would ensure that Australia would retain the Ashes, they batted on until they had reached 656–8 before declaring, with Bobby Simpson scoring 311, his first Test century. England responded with 611 (Ken Barrington 256, Ted Dexter 174) and the match ended in the dullest of draws.

County Championship

Gillette Cup

Leading batsmen

Leading bowlers

References

Annual reviews
 Playfair Cricket Annual 1965
 Wisden Cricketers' Almanack 1965

Further reading
 Bill Frindall, The Wisden Book of Test Cricket 1877-1978, Wisden, 1979
 Chris Harte, A History of Australian Cricket, Andre Deutsch, 1993
 Ray Robinson, On Top Down Under, Cassell, 1975

External links
 CricketArchive – season summary

1964 in English cricket
English cricket seasons in the 20th century